They Are Their Own Gifts is a 1978 American documentary film. The film depicts three women artists: Alice Neel, Muriel Rukeyser, and Anna Sokolow.

The film was made by Margaret Murphy and Lucille Rhodes.

References

American documentary films
1978 films
20th-century American women artists
1970s American films